Quillebeuf-sur-Seine (literally Quillebeuf on Seine) is a commune in the north-western part of the Eure department in Normandy in northern France.

Quillebeuf, which is an old port, is located on left bank of the Seine. The town is connected to Port-Jérôme-sur-Seine, in Seine-Maritime via a car ferry.

Population

See also
Communes of the Eure department

References

Communes of Eure